Ashutosh Singh (born 5 January 1994) is an Indian cricketer who plays for Madhya Pradesh cricket team. He made his Twenty20 debut against Railways cricket team at Assam cricket team at Reliance Stadium in January, 2016. He made his first-class debut for Chhattisgarh in the 2016–17 Ranji Trophy on 6 October 2016, scoring a century. He made his List A debut for Chhattisgarh in the 2016–17 Vijay Hazare Trophy on 25 February 2017.

He was the leading run-scorer for Chhattisgarh in the 2017–18 Ranji Trophy, with 467 runs in six matches. In July 2018, he was named in the squad for India Red for the 2018–19 Duleep Trophy. He was also the leading run-scorer for Chhattisgarh in the 2018–19 Vijay Hazare Trophy, with 211 runs in six matches.  In 2022 he will be club professional for Netherfield CC in Kendal.

References

External links
 
 Cricketarchive

1994 births
Living people
Indian cricketers
Chhattisgarh cricketers
India Red cricketers
Madhya Pradesh cricketers
People from Ambikapur, India
Cricketers from Chhattisgarh